Bäumer is a German surname. Notable people with the surname include:

 Gertrud Bäumer (1873–1954), German lawyer and politician
 Ludwig Bäumer (1888–1928), German writer and Communist activist
 Marie Bäumer (born 1969), German actress
 Paul Bäumer (1896–1927), German pilot

See also
 Baumer
 Bäumler